Narvon is an unincorporated community in Caernarvon Township in Lancaster County, Pennsylvania, United States. It has a sizeable Amish population.

Climate
The climate in this area is characterized by hot, humid summers and generally mild to cool winters.  According to the Köppen Climate Classification system, Narvon has a humid subtropical climate, abbreviated "Cfa" on climate maps.

References

External links

Unincorporated communities in Lancaster County, Pennsylvania
Unincorporated communities in Pennsylvania